Celtic knots are a variety of knots and stylized graphical representations of knots used for decoration, used extensively in the Celtic style of Insular art. These knots are most known for their adaptation for use in the ornamentation of Christian monuments and manuscripts, such as the 8th-century St. Teilo Gospels, the Book of Kells and the Lindisfarne Gospels. Most are endless knots, and many are varieties of basket weave knots.

History 
The use of interlace patterns had its origins in the late Roman Empire. Knot patterns first appeared in the third and fourth centuries AD and can be seen in Roman floor mosaics of that time. Interesting developments in the artistic use of interlaced knot patterns are found in Byzantine architecture and book illumination, Coptic art, Celtic art, Islamic art, Kievan Rus'ian book illumination, Ethiopian art, and European architecture and book illumination. 

Spirals, step patterns, and key patterns are dominant motifs in Celtic art before the Christian influence on the Celts, which began around 450. These designs found their way into early Christian manuscripts and artwork with the addition of depictions from life, such as animals, plants and even humans. In the beginning, the patterns were intricate interwoven cords, called plaits, which can also be found in other areas of Europe, such as Italy, in the 6th century. A fragment of a Gospel Book, now in the Durham Cathedral library and created in northern Britain in the 7th century, contains the earliest example of true knotted designs in the Celtic manner.

Examples of plait work (a woven, unbroken cord design) predate knotwork designs in several cultures around the world, but the broken and reconnected plait work that is characteristic of true knotwork began in northern Italy and southern Gaul and spread to Ireland by the 7th century. The style is most commonly associated with the Celtic lands, but it was also practiced extensively in England and was exported to Europe by Irish and Northumbrian monastic activities on the continent. J. Romilly Allen has identified "eight elementary knots which form the basis of nearly all the interlaced patterns in Celtic decorative art".

The Celtic knot as a tattoo design became popular in the United States in the 1970s and 1980s.

Examples

See also 

 Celtic art
Celtic button knot
 Celtic cross
 Croatian interlace
 Endless knot
 George Bain (artist)
 Islamic interlace patterns
 Khachkars
 Knot garden
 Knot (mathematics)
 Oseberg style
 Triquetra
 Turk's head knot

References

External links 

Draw Your Own Celtic Knotwork Comprehensive list of links to both knotwork tutorials and a knotwork bibliography
 Celtic Interlace - An Overview by Stephen Walker, reproduced with permission from Dalriada Magazine, 2000
 Font with Zoomorphic (animal) ornaments GPL Font and generator project
 Celtic Knot Generator Online Celtic knot designer that uses the Knots typeface.

Knot
Decorative knots